Qorveh-e Darjazin County is in Hamadan province, Iran. The capital of the county is the city of Qorveh-e Darjazin. At the 2006 census, the region's population (as Qorveh-e Darjazin District of Razan County) was 39,852 in 9,842 households. The following census in 2011 counted 40,253 people in 11,558 households. At the 2016 census, the district's population was 36,999 in 11,626 households. It was separated from Razan County in 2019 to form Qorveh-e Darjazin County.

Administrative divisions

The population history of Qorveh-e Darjazin County's administrative divisions (as a district of Razan County) over three consecutive censuses is shown in the following table.

References

Counties of Hamadan Province